The 1991 Fort Lauderdale Strikers season was the second season of the team in the American Professional Soccer League.  It was the club's twenty-fifth season in professional soccer.  The team finished in first place in the American Conference, went to the playoffs, and made it to the semifinals.

Background

Review

Competitions

APSL regular season

American Conference

Western Conference

Results summaries

Results by round

Match reports

APSL Playoffs

Semifinal 1

The Albany Capitals advanced to the final.

Semifinal 2

The San Francisco Bay Blackhawks advanced to the final.

Statistics

Transfers

References 

1991
Fort Lauderdale Strikers
Fort Lauderdale Strikers